Parliamentary elections were held in Rwanda on 26 December 1988. At the time the country was still a one-party state, with the National Revolutionary Movement for Development as the sole legal party. The National Development Council was composed of 70 seats, with 139 candidates contesting the election. Twenty-six MPs lost their seats to challengers, whilst voter turnout was 98.5%.

Results

References

Elections in Rwanda
Rwanda
1988 in Rwanda
One-party elections
Parliament of Rwanda